The following tables show state-by-state results in the Australian Senate at the 1983 Australian federal election. Senators total 25 coalition (23 Liberal, one coalition National, one CLP), 30 Labor, three non-coalition National, five Democrats, and one Independent. Senate terms are six years (three for territories). As the election was the result of a double dissolution, all 64 senate seats were vacant. All elected senators took their seats immediately with a backdated starting date of 1 July 1982, except for the territorial senators who took their seats at the election. Half of the senators elected in each state were allocated 3-year terms (from 1 July 1982) to restore the rotation. It is the most recent federal Senate election won by the Labor Party.

Australia

New South Wales

Victoria

Queensland

Western Australia

South Australia

Tasmania

Australian Capital Territory

Northern Territory

See also

1983 Australian federal election
Candidates of the Australian federal election, 1983
Members of the Australian Senate, 1983–1985

References

External links
Adam Carr's Election Archive

1983 elections in Australia
Senate 1983
Australian Senate elections